Jessie Wilson Manning (Wilson; October 26, 1855 – August 30, 1947) was an American author and lecturer. She was an active worker and eloquent speaker on literary subjects and for the cause of temperance. Manning died in 1947.

Biography
Jessie Wilson was born in Mount Pleasant, Iowa, October 26, 1855. She spent her childhood and received her education in Mount Pleasant. She graduated from the Iowa Wesleyan University, in 1874.

Manning entered the held of platform work immediately after graduation, and was for five years a speaker on literary subjects and for the cause of temperance. In the fall of 1889, she married Eli Manning, of Chariton, Iowa, prominent in business and political circles in that State. Since her marriage, Manning devoted herself to her home and family of three sons. Her first book, published in 1887, titled Passion of Life, was her most ambitious work and achieved a moderate success. She wrote a large number of articles for the Iowa press, among them a series of literary criticism, and poems, and essays for magazines, besides stories under a pen-name. Her Chariton home was a social and literary center.

Jessie Wilson Manning died August 30, 1947, at Chariton, Iowa.

Selected works
 The Passion of Life, 1867

References

Bibliography

External links

 

19th-century American writers
19th-century American women writers
1855 births
1947 deaths
People from Mount Pleasant, Iowa
Writers from Iowa
American temperance activists
Iowa Wesleyan University alumni
Wikipedia articles incorporating text from A Woman of the Century